The Istanbul Foundation for Culture and Arts (İKSV) is a non-profit foundation, based in Turkey. It was founded in 1973 by seventeen businesspeople and art enthusiasts led by Dr. Nejat F. Eczacıbaşı

The goal of the foundation is to turn Istanbul into a major center within the international culture and arts community. The first international event initiated by the foundation was the Istanbul Festival, first held at 1973, coinciding with the 50th anniversary celebrations of the Turkish Republic. Currently, the foundation coordinates several annual festivals and biennials, a performance hall and other cultural operations linked to its purpose.

The foundation is currently based at Sishane, at the Nejat Eczacıbaşı Building (formerly called Deniz Palas). Besides the offices, the building also hosts a performance hall called Salon, which is also run by the foundation.

Regular events
 Istanbul Film Festival
 
 Istanbul Music Festival
 Istanbul Jazz Festival
 Istanbul Biennial
 Istanbul Design Biennial

References

External links
 

Organizations based in Istanbul
Organizations established in 1973
1973 establishments in Turkey